The Central District of Mamasani County is a district (bakhsh) in Mamasani County, Fars Province, Iran. At the 2006 census, its population was 97,206, in 21,208 families.  The District has two cities: Nurabad and Khumeh Zar. The District has five rural districts (dehestan): Bakesh-e Do Rural District, Bakesh-e Yek Rural District, Fahlian Rural District, Javid-e Mahuri Rural District, and Jowzar Rural District.

References 

Mamasani County
Districts of Fars Province